The Roundtable on Sustainable Palm Oil (RSPO) was established in 2004 with the objective of promoting the growth and use of sustainable palm oil products through global standards and multistakeholder governance. The seat of the association is in Zurich, Switzerland, while the secretariat is currently based in Kuala Lumpur, with a satellite office in Jakarta. RSPO currently has 4,706 members from 94 countries.

51,999,404 metric tonnes of palm oil produced in 2016 was RSPO certified.

Criticisms
The RSPO has been criticised by various sectors, especially the environmental NGOs. Issues include the impact of palm oil plantations on the orangutan population; destruction of tropical forest for the new oil palm plantations; the burning and draining of large tracts of peat swamp forest in Borneo, Malaysia. The fact that RSPO members are allowed to clear cut pristine forest areas, when there are large areas of grasslands available in Indonesia, raises doubts about commitment to sustainability. In 2013, the 11th annual RSPO meeting was crashed by palm oil workers and others, and Indonesian and international labour-rights groups have documented a litany of abuses, including forced labour and child labour. A 2013 study uncovered "flagrant disregard for human rights at some of the very plantations the RSPO certifies as 'sustainable'".

The RSPO's pace of progress has drawn considerable negative attention. The organization is currently revising its core Principles and Criteria, only now after five years with the current set, to include a clear standard on deforestation of high conservation value forests, and it took until 2017 to develop a clear Smallholder Standard.

The Rainforest Action Network views the RSPO as a greenwashing tool. Meanwhile, Greenpeace claims that, whilst RSPO has finally banned deforestation after 14 years, this isn't enforced and its members continue to destroy forests.

Scientific analysis
In July 2020, scientists used 30-year time series of satellite images to reveal that palm oil producing areas certified as sustainable had replaced tropical forests of Sumatra and Borneo, including important habitat for endangered mammals. The assessment relied on causal inference – i.e., that deforestation was explicitly linked to certified plantations. A counterfactual evaluation of forest loss in the same region found that certification significantly reduced deforestation, but clearance of peatland clearance or land fires, among participating plantations. Counterfactual evaluations also reveal subtle differences in oil palm impacts between regions, and important trade-offs between environment and development. For example, an appraisal of more than 3000 villages in Indonesia with large-scale oil palm plantations found that compared with similar villages with non-certified plantations, those with RSPO certified plantations experienced an overall reduction in well-being. However, this pattern masked considerable variation across oil palm producing villages - those that had long established plantation agriculture (primarily in Sumatra) experienced improvements in well-being following certification, while those that relied more on subsistence-based livelihoods (primarily in Kalimantan) did not. Those involved in counterfactual evaluations of oil palm and certification agree that more positive impacts of certification will follow recent improvements in standards

World Wildlife Fund (WWF)
The WWF released in 2009 a Palm Oil Buyer's Scorecard. The website stated in 2010:

Clearing for oil palm plantations threatens some of the world’s greatest forests, endangered species such as orangutans, and puts forest-dwelling people at risk. But with better management practices, the palm oil industry could provide benefits without threatening our some of our most breathtaking natural treasures...

Reaching those objectives requires a common language for industry, environmental and social groups to work together. Through the Roundtable on Sustainable Palm Oil (RSPO), WWF has helped to establish a platform for these parties to collaborate towards the production of sustainable palm oil. Thanks to the RSPO, sustainable palm oil is now on the market. By applying stringent production criteria to all stages of palm oil manufacture, some companies are proving that oil palm plantations need not flourish at the expense of rainforests. But so much more remains to be done. Too many palm oil producers still ignore the destructive impacts of palm oil plantations, contributing to biodiversity loss and social unrest and more companies that buy palm oil need to switch to using certified sustainable palm oil in their products.

In 2018, the WWF updated its position to support the RSPO Updated Principles and Criteria, the outcome of an extensive multi-stakeholder consultation process on achieving sustainable palm oil production, stating that the RSPO "represents an essential tool that can help companies achieve their commitments to palm oil that is free of deforestation, expansion on peat, exploitation and the use of fire."

WWF continues to monitor the palm oil industry.

Other Roundtable initiatives

Similar initiatives have been established for other sectors including: Roundtable on Sustainable Biofuels, Roundtable on Sustainable Biomaterials, Roundtable on Sustainable Forests, Roundtable on Sustainable Development, Roundtable on Responsible Soy, and Roundtable for a Sustainable Cocoa Economy.

See also
 Bumitama Agri
 GreenPalm
 IOI Group
 Social and environmental impact of palm oil
 Sustainability standards and certification
 Sustainable biofuel
 Borneo peat swamp forests

References

External links

Palm Oil - Production, Consumption, Exports, and Imports Statistics by Country
Are emission reductions from peatlands MRV-able? 
The impacts and opportunities of oil palm in Southeast Asia: What do we know and what do we need to know? (2009).
FAQ: Palm oil, forests and climate change. 
What is the Roundtable on Sustainable Palm Oil? | Visual.ly
Profile : Roundtable on Sustainable Palm Oil.

Agricultural organisations based in Switzerland
Palm oil
International environmental organizations
International forestry organizations
Environmental certification
Agricultural organisations based in Malaysia
Organizations established in 2004